Sandra Brown (born 1948) is an American author.

Sandra Brown may also refer to:

Sandra Brown (campaigner) (born 1949), Scottish campaigner and expert on child protection issues
Sandra Brown (cricketer) (born 1940), England cricketer
Sandra Brown (sprinter) (born 1946), Australian sprinter
Sandra Brown (ultradistance athlete) (born 1949), British ultra distance walker/runner

See also
 Sandy Brown (disambiguation)